Paul F. Murphy (born January 25, 1949) is a percussionist, bandleader and composer. He is best known for having led a variety of small jazz ensembles, and for his long tenure in groups led by saxophonist Jimmy Lyons.

Career 
Murphy began playing drums at a very early age, and made the acquaintance of Gene Krupa at age six. He went on to study with Krupa, Louis Bellson, and Joseph Levitt, the principal percussionist of the National Symphony Orchestra and director of the Peabody Conservatory.

At age sixteen, Murphy began playing in the Washington, D.C. area with Duke Ellington's bassist Billy Taylor, who exposed him to the music of pianist Cecil Taylor. At Billy Taylor's advice, Murphy moved to San Francisco, where he established himself as a bandleader. While there, he met and befriended Cecil Taylor and Jimmy Lyons. At the suggestion of Lyons, he then moved to New York, where he managed Ali's Alley, a club run by drummer Rashied Ali, and began playing and recording with Lyons' groups as well as his own quintet. While in New York, Murphy immersed himself in both the experimental jazz and punk rock scenes.

Following Lyons' untimely death in 1986, Murphy spent time playing drums in Las Vegas, then moved back to San Francisco, where he formed Trio Hurricane with saxophonist Glenn Spearman and bassist William Parker. He moved back to the Washington, D.C. area in 1990, and has since collaborated with pianists Joel Futterman and Larry Willis, poet Jere Carroll, and others.

Murphy has been described as "a fluent, compositionally minded master drummer." One reviewer wrote "It is hard to believe that Murphy is actually moving through space as he moves from one part of the drum set to another because the action is seamless... Murphy uses every tool he has on every drum surface; hands, brushes, mallets and sticks on snare, tom, cymbals, bass and bongos. The drumming possesses substantial physicality even in its subtleties, and often an incredibly rapid and feather-light touch." Another reviewer described him as "a drummer/sound painter who totally trusts his wildest creative impulses."

Discography

As leader
 In a Dream Stream: Paul Murphy at CBS (Murphy Records, 1981) with Mary Anne Driscoll
 Red Snapper: Paul Murphy at CBS (CIMP, 1982) with Jimmy Lyons, Dewey Johnson, Karen Borca, Mary Anne Driscoll
 Cloudburst: Paul Murphy at RCA (Murphy Records, 1983) with Jimmy Lyons, Dewey Johnson, Karen Borca, Mary Anne Driscoll
 Trio Hurricane: Suite Of Winds (Black Saint Records, 1986) with Glenn Spearman and William Parker
 Trio Hurricane: Live at Fire in the Valley (Eremite Records, 1997) with Glenn Spearman and William Parker
 Breakaway (Murphy Records, 2001) with Joel Futterman and Jere Carroll
 Enarre (Cadence, 2002) with Joel Futterman and Kash Killion
 Shadow * Intersections * West (Cadence, 2004) with Marco Eneidi and Kash Killion
 The Powers of Two, Volume 2 (Mapleshade, 2006) with Larry Willis
 Excursions (Murphy Records, 2007) with Larry Willis
 Exposé (Murphy Records, 2008) with Larry Willis
 Foundations (Murphy Records, 2009) with Larry Willis
 Freedom's Bell (Murphy Records, 2017) with Larry Willis, Jere Carroll, and Dominic Fragman

As sideman

With Jimmy Lyons
 Riffs (hat MUSICS, 1982)
 Wee Sneezawee (Black Saint Records, 1984)
 Give It Up (Black Saint Records, 1985)
 The Box Set (Ayler Records, 2003)

With Larry Willis
 Sunshower (Mapleshade, 2001)
 The Powers of Two (Mapleshade, 2004)

With Raphe Malik
 Companions (Eremite Records, 2002)

With Eddie Gale
 A Minute With Miles (Mapleshade, 1992)

With Mary Anne Driscoll
 Inside Out (CIMP, 2004)

With Kendra Shank
 Afterglow (Mapleshade, 1994)

With Windmill Saxophone Quartet
 Touch of Evil (Mapleshade, 2002)

Compilations
 Vision Volume One: Vision Festival 1997 Compiled (AUM Fidelity, 1998)

Documentaries
 Inside Out in the Open

References

External links
"Paul F. Murphy and Dominic Fragman: A New Sound in Musical Expression"
"The Spirit of Jazz & Democracy"
"The Spirit of Innovation & Freedom"

1949 births
American jazz drummers
Musicians from Worcester, Massachusetts
Living people
Mapleshade Records artists